Karakale can refer to:

 Karakale, Aziziye
 Karakale, Çıldır
 Karakale, Hanak
 Karakale, İspir
 Karakale, Karayazı
 Karakale, Pasinler